Pyramiding may refer to:

 Pyramiding, a deformity in turtle shells
 Pyramiding, a practice in using performance-enhancing substances
 Pyramiding (tax evasion), a practice where an employer intentionally fails to remit payroll taxes to the appropriate taxation authority
Pyramid trading, a trading strategy
Pyramid scheme